The 1998–99 NBA season was the 29th season of the National Basketball Association in Cleveland, Ohio. On March 23, 1998, the owners of all 29 NBA teams voted 27–2 to reopen the league's collective bargaining agreement, seeking changes to the league's salary cap system, and a ceiling on individual player salaries. The National Basketball Players Association (NBPA) opposed to the owners' plan, and wanted raises for players who earned the league's minimum salary. After both sides failed to reach an agreement, the owners called for a lockout, which began on July 1, 1998, putting a hold on all team trades, free agent signings and training camp workouts, and cancelling many NBA regular season and preseason games. Due to the lockout, the NBA All-Star Game, which was scheduled to be played in Philadelphia on February 14, 1999, was also cancelled. However, on January 6, 1999, NBA commissioner David Stern, and NBPA director Billy Hunter finally reached an agreement to end the lockout. The deal was approved by both the players and owners, and was signed on January 20, ending the lockout after 204 days. The regular season began on February 5, and was cut short to just 50 games instead of the regular 82-game schedule.

In the off-season, the Cavaliers re-signed free agent Johnny Newman, who previously played for the team during the 1986–87 season. However, the Cavaliers' playoff hopes were dashed as second-year star Zydrunas Ilgauskas broke his left foot after only playing just five games, averaging 15.2 points, 8.8 rebounds and 1.4 blocks per game. At midseason, the team traded Vitaly Potapenko to the Boston Celtics in exchange for Andrew DeClercq, and signed free agent Corie Blount, who was previously released by the Los Angeles Lakers. With a 21–18 record in mid April, the Cavaliers struggled as they went on a 7-game losing streak, and lost ten of their final eleven games, finishing 7th in the Central Division with a 22–28 record, missing the playoffs.

Shawn Kemp led the team in scoring and rebounding, averaging 20.5 points and 9.2 rebounds per game, while Wesley Person averaged 11.2 points per game, and second-year guard Derek Anderson provided the team with 10.8 points per game off the bench. In addition, second-year guard Brevin Knight contributed 9.6 points, 7.7 assists and 1.8 steals per game, while second-year forward Cedric Henderson provided with 9.1 points per game, and Danny Ferry contributed 7.0 points per game off the bench. However, Kemp was a shell of his former self as he reported to practice, weighing 315 lbs, and according to the team's General Manager Wayne Embry, the league listed him at 280.

Following the season, head coach Mike Fratello was fired after spending six seasons with the team, while Anderson and Newman were both traded to the Los Angeles Clippers, who then dealt Newman back to the New Jersey Nets, and Blount signed as a free agent with the Phoenix Suns.

Key Dates:

Offseason

Free Agents

Trades

Draft picks

 1st round pick (#19) traded to Milwaukee in Sherman Douglas deal. Used to draft Pat Garrity.

Roster

Regular season

Season standings

Record vs. opponents

Game log

|- style="background:#fcc;"
| 1 || February 5, 1999 || @ Atlanta
| L 83–100
|
|
|
| Georgia Dome19,806
| 0–1
|- style="background:#fcc;"
| 2 || February 6, 1999 || @ Boston
| L 73–77
|
|
|
| FleetCenter18,173
| 0–2

|- style="background:#cfc;"
| 13 || March 2, 1999 || Boston
| W 116–99
|
|
|
| Gund Arena12,906
| 6–7
|- style="background:#cfc;"
| 24 || March 23, 1999 || Boston
| W 113–86
|
|
|
| Gund Arena15,810
| 13–11

|- style="background:#cfc;"
| 35 || April 10, 1999 || Atlanta
| W 81–67
|
|
|
| Gund Arena13,859
| 18–17
|- style="background:#fcc;"
| 36 || April 12, 1999 || @ Boston
| L 89–103
|
|
|
| FleetCenter15,622
| 18–18

|- style="background:#fcc;"
| 48 || May 2, 1999 || Atlanta
| W 65–76
|
|
|
| Gund Arena12,690
| 22–26

Player stats

Regular season

Player Statistics Citation:

Awards and records

Awards

Records

Milestones

All-Star

Transactions

Trades

Free Agents

Development League

References

 Cleveland Cavaliers on Database Basketball
 Cleveland Cavaliers on Basketball Reference

Cleveland Cavaliers seasons
Cleve
Cleve